Seo Min-jung (born July 11, 1979) is a South Korean actress. She made her entertainment debut in 2000 as a VJ on cable program Music Under Heaven. Seo rose to stardom in the 2006 sitcom Unstoppable High Kick!, playing the role of a teacher whose high school student has a crush on her. After marrying Korean-American dentist Ahn Sang-hoon on August 25, 2007, Seo retired from show business and migrated to New York City. She gave birth to a daughter, Ahn Yae-jin, in 2008.

Filmography

Television drama
Honest Living(2002)
That Summer's Typhoon(2005)
Love and Ambition(2006)
High Kick! (2006)

Film
Jenny, Juno (2005)
Arctic Tale (2007) (Korean dubbed narration)

Variety show
"Taste of Wife, Reality Show, Macomb, New York Life" (TV Chosun)
Music Under Heaven (NTV)
Hotline School (Mnet)
Curiosity Paradise (SBS)
Section TV (MBC)
King of Mask Singer (MBC)
Radio Star (MBC)
In-Laws in Practice (2018, tvN)
Stranger (JTBC)

Awards
2005 SBS Drama Awards: Special Award for Radio (Our Joyful Young Days)
2007 Mnet 20's Choice Awards: Best Kiss with Choi Min-yong (Unstoppable High Kick!)

References

External links
 

Seo Min-jung Fan Cafe at Daum 

 
Seo Min-jung at Naver Movies 

1979 births
Living people
South Korean film actresses
South Korean television actresses
Ewha Womans University alumni
South Korean expatriates in the United States